Aaron Michael Hicks (born October 2, 1989) is an American professional baseball center fielder for the New York Yankees of Major League Baseball (MLB). He was drafted by the Minnesota Twins in the first round of the 2008 MLB draft.  He made his MLB debut on In 2013 with the Twins and was traded to the Yankees after the 2015 season.

Early life
Hicks grew up in Long Beach, California, attending Woodrow Wilson Classical High School, where he was a star baseball player. He also attended Major League Baseball's (MLB) Urban Youth Academy, designed to promote baseball in the urban areas.

Career

Minor leagues
A switch hitter, Aaron was drafted by Minnesota Twins in the first round of the 2008 MLB draft out of Wilson Classical High School in Long Beach, California. In his first professional season, Hicks was tabbed a 2008 Baseball America Rookie All-Star and named the top prospect in the Twins' organization. He  batted .318 with four home runs, 27 runs batted in, twelve stolen bases and 28 walks for the Gulf Coast League Twins to earn a Gulf Coast League postseason All-Star nod. In 2009, Hicks batted .251 with four home runs, 29 RBIs, ten steals and 40 walks for the Beloit Snappers. He returned to Beloit in 2010 and hit .279 with eight home runs.

Playing for the Fort Myers Miracle in 2011, he hit .242 with five home runs. In 2012, he hit .286 with 13 home runs for the New Britain Rock Cats. After being sent down from the major leagues in August, for the 2013 season in AAA he batted .222 with the Rochester Red Wings.

Aaron was a top 100 prospect by Baseball America four times.

Minnesota Twins (2013–2015)

On March 24, 2013, it was announced that Hicks would be the starting center fielder for the Minnesota Twins. He chose his new number to honor Dave Winfield, who wore 32 for the Twins. He was sent down to AAA on August 1, and was not called back up in 2013.

In 2013, Hicks batted .192 in 281 at bats, with a .259 on-base percentage.  Jim Souhan of the Star Tribune wrote that he became: "the latest unpaid spokesman for the Public Service Announcement that reminds baseball fans not to believe anything they see in spring training."

Despite his underwhelming 2013 performance, Hicks was named the starting center fielder for the 2014 season. Hicks' 2014 season did not show improvement at the plate. Through 47 games, Hicks hit .201 and was demoted to Double A on June 9.

Hicks gave up switch hitting during the 2014 season due to a lack of confidence in his ability to bat left-handed. However, he went back to switch hitting less than a month later.

For the 2015 season, Hicks hit .256 with 11 home runs and 33 RBIs in 97 games.

New York Yankees
On November 11, 2015, the Twins traded Hicks to the New York Yankees for John Ryan Murphy. The Yankees targeted Hicks due to his athleticism, strong throwing arm, and ability to hit left-handed pitching.

2016
During a game against the Oakland Athletics on April 20, 2016, Hicks made a throw that nabbed Danny Valencia at home plate for an out. In 123 games of 2016, Hicks batted .217 with eight home runs and 31 RBI.

2017
In early June 2017, with just 154 at bats, Hicks had already hit more home runs (10) and RBIs (34) than in all of last season.  As of June 9 he ranked seventh in the majors in both OBP and OPS. On April 13, 2017, Hicks hit two home runs; one batting left handed and one batting right handed. He drove in all three runs as the Yankees won 3-2 over the Tampa Bay Rays. Hicks suffered an oblique injury in late June, causing him to go on the 10-day disabled list. On September 3, Hicks was again placed on the 10-day disabled list due to a left oblique injury. He returned from the DL on September 26. Hicks ended the season with 15 home runs, 52 RBIs, and a .266 average, all career highs.

2018
On March 30, 2018, the Yankees placed Hicks on the 10-day disabled list due to a strained right intercostal muscle. He was reinstated from the DL on April 12 and hit an inside-the-park home run against the Detroit Tigers on the next day. Hicks would hit another inside-the-park-home run against the Kansas City Royals on May 19, becoming the first Yankee since Mickey Mantle in 1958 to hit two inside-the-park-home runs in a single season. On July 1, Hicks hit three home runs in one game against the Boston Red Sox. Hicks ended the season with 27 home runs, 79 RBIs, and 119 hits, all career highs.

2019
On January 11, 2019, Hicks signed a one-year, $6 million contract to remain with the Yankees. On February 25, Hicks signed a seven-year, $70 million contract extension, replacing the one-year deal. The deal includes a $12.5 million club option for 2026, a $1 million buyout and a $2 million signing bonus. He began the 2019 year on the 10-day injured list due to a lower back strain. On May 6, he was optioned to the Tampa Tarpons for a rehab assignment. On June 24, against the Blue Jays, Hicks hit a home run that helped the Yankees tie a league record with 27 straight games hitting a home run. On June 29, 2019, Hicks became the first MLB player to hit a home run in Europe during the first inning of the Red Sox-Yankees 2019 London Series. On September 10, Hicks left the game with an elbow injury. It was revealed that Hicks was diagnosed with a right flexor strain in his right elbow since August 3, and that Tommy John surgery would be necessary to correct the problem. The Yankees ruled Hicks out for the rest of 2019 due to his elbow injury.

On October 11, 2019, Aaron Hicks told a New York Post reporter that he would be on the ALCS roster against the Houston Astros. The following day, the Yankees announced that they had reinstated Hicks from the 60-day injured list and added him to the roster, replacing Luke Voit. He revealed that after his Tommy John surgery recommendation, he had decided not to have surgery immediately and engaged in light physical activity on his own. After a week, he visited the Yankees’ spring training complex to work out his elbow. Following a few weeks of regular exercise, it was determined that he would not in fact require surgery and he joined his team on the road in Houston. He later underwent the surgery, and was expected to miss 8–10 months.

2020 
With COVID-19 pandemic delaying the start of the season by over 4 months, Hicks was able to return to play in the intra-squad scrimmage match just 8 months post surgery. In 54 games, Hicks batted .225 with six home runs and 21 RBIs.

2021 
On May 21, 2021, Hicks underwent surgery to repair a torn tendon sheath in his left wrist. The injury was expected to keep Hicks out for the remainder of the season. On May 30, Hicks was placed on the 60-day injured list. In 32 games for the Yankees, Hicks posted a .194/.294/.333 batting line with 4 home runs and 14 RBI.

2022 
On July 6, 2022, Hicks hit his first career grand slam while pinch hitting for Matt Carpenter as part of a 16-0 victory over the Pittsburgh Pirates. Fellow outfielder Aaron Judge, who Hicks eventually replaced in center field, had hit a grand slam earlier that night, making the pair the first two players with the same first name to hit grand slams in the same game.

In 2022, he batted .216/.330/.313 with 8 home runs and 40 RBIs.

Personal life
Hicks' father, Joseph, was drafted by the San Diego Padres in the 12th round of the 1975 amateur draft, but his career was ended early by an eye injury. This led Joseph to push his son into golf before baseball. Hicks is an accomplished golfer, having competed in numerous youth golf tournaments. After making baseball his focus, he has continued to play golf and played in a PGA Tour event in 2019.

On October 27, 2021, Hicks got engaged to professional golfer Cheyenne Woods. Their son was born in April 2022. They reside in Scottsdale, Arizona.

References

External links

1989 births
Living people
Baseball players from Long Beach, California
African-American baseball players
Major League Baseball outfielders
Minnesota Twins players
New York Yankees players
Gulf Coast Twins players
Beloit Snappers players
Fort Myers Miracle players
Mesa Solar Sox players
New Britain Rock Cats players
Bravos de Margarita players
American expatriate baseball players in Venezuela
Rochester Red Wings players
Wilson Classical High School alumni
21st-century African-American sportspeople
20th-century African-American people